Cageless is the seventh studio album by the Canadian pop rock group Hedley, released through Universal Music Canada on September 29, 2017. It was supported by the singles "Love Again" and "Better Days". The music video for the former was shot for virtual reality. The album received a Juno Award nomination for Pop Album of the Year. The album sold a total of 9,000 units.

Background
Cageless was released on September 29, 2017. It is their first album release with their new drummer Jay Benison. Lead singer Jacob Hoggard had written 30 to 35 songs for the album, before finalizing the 10 tracks for Cageless. The band announced a headlining tour that would begin in 2018 called the "Cageless Tour" which featured supporting acts, Shawn Hook and Neon Dreams. However, amidst the sexual assault allegations towards the band, mostly Hoggard, both Neon Dreams and Hook decided to dropout of the tour. The band's management team also dropped the group in light of the allegations. Despite the allegations made towards the band, the group continued the Cageless Tour until March 2018.

Singles
The second track "Love Again" is the first single released from the album. The song entered Billboard Canadian Hot 100 and peaked at number 50. Their second single and lead track, "Better Days" was released on August 18, 2017 and peaked at number 42 on Billboard Canadian Hot 100. "Obsession" was released as a promotional single on September 15, 2017.

Track listing
 "Better Days" – 3:43
 "Love Again" – 3:04
 "Obsession" – 3:44
 "Tidal Wave" – 3:28
 "In Love with a Broken Heart" – 3:37
 "Bad Tattoo" – 3:47
 "All Night" – 3:46
 "I'm On Fire" – 3:22
 "Wild" – 3:36
 "17" – 3:34

Charts

References

2017 albums
Hedley (band) albums